Hisako Mori (born 4 May 1964) is a Japanese badminton player, born in Kanagawa Prefecture. She competed in women's doubles with team mate Kimiko Jinnai at the 1992 Summer Olympics in Barcelona.

References

External links

1964 births
Living people
Sportspeople from Kanagawa Prefecture
Japanese female badminton players
Olympic badminton players of Japan
Badminton players at the 1992 Summer Olympics
Asian Games medalists in badminton
Badminton players at the 1990 Asian Games
Asian Games bronze medalists for Japan
Medalists at the 1990 Asian Games